Robert Pollard (born 1957) is an American singer-songwriter, lead singer of Guided by Voices.

Robert Pollard may also refer to:

 Robert Pollard (American football) (born 1981), American football defensive end
 Robert Pollard (engraver) (1755–1838), English engraver and painter
 Robert Nelson Pollard (1880–1954), United States federal judge
 Bob Pollard (born 1948), American football player
 Bob Pollard (footballer) (1899–after 1933), English footballer